The Maritime Transportation Security Act of 2002 (MTSA) is an Act of Congress enacted by the 107th United States Congress to address port and waterway security.  It was signed into law by President George W. Bush on November 25, 2002.

This law is the U.S. implementation of the International Ship and Port Facility Security Code (ISPS). Its full provisions came into effect on July 1, 2004. It requires vessels and port facilities to conduct vulnerability assessments and develop security plans that may include passenger, vehicle and baggage screening procedures; security patrols; establishing restricted areas; personnel identification procedures; access control measures; and/or installation of surveillance equipment.  The Act creates a consistent security program for all the nation's ports to better identify and deter threats.

Developed using risk-based methodology, the MTSA security regulations focus on those sectors of maritime industry that have a higher risk of involvement in a transportation security incident, including various tank vessels, barges, large passenger vessels, cargo vessels, towing vessels, offshore oil and gas platforms, and port facilities that handle certain kinds of dangerous cargo or service the vessels listed above.

MTSA also required the establishment committees in all the nation's ports to coordinate the activities of all port stakeholders, including other federal, local and state agencies, industry and the boating public.  These groups, called Area Maritime Security Committees, are tasked with collaborating on plans to secure their ports so that the resources of an area can be best used to deter, prevent and respond to terror threats.

The U.S. Coast Guard issued regulations to enact the provisions of the Act and to align domestic regulations with the maritime security standards of SOLAS and the ISPS Code.  The regulations are found in Title 33 of the Code of Federal Regulations, Parts 101 through 107.  Part 104 contains vessel security regulations, including some provisions that apply to foreign ships in U.S. waters.

Background and History
Prior to September 11, 2001, maritime security, while being considered as a necessary element of the management of the maritime community, was a relatively small priority in actual application. Historically, the two major exceptions to this statement were the two World Wars, where port security and vessel protection were major concerns because of the substantial role the maritime community had in prosecuting the war effort. However, the terrorist attacks in 2001 altered the maritime security culture in the country by making maritime security a part of the normal operating environment.

Among the first laws applied to maritime security was the Espionage Act of 1917. This was a broad brush law that extended far beyond the maritime realm to encompass any and all acts of sedition against the United States, and came at the height of World War I. Also during World War I, the U. S. Coast Guard first designated officers as Captains of the Port. Most were senior officers who oversaw the loading of cargoes, particularly dangerous ones such as munitions. Over time and with the threats and actual attacks of World War II and the Cold War environment, maritime security became better defined. Much of the increased responsibility for maritime security and clarification of roles resided in the Coast Guard's Captains of the Port.

The Safety of Naval Vessels Act of 1941 authorized them to control the anchorage and movement of any vessel in the navigable waters of the United States to ensure the safety and security of any U. S. naval vessel. The Magnuson Act and Executive Order 10173 provided broad power to order vessel movements, place guards on vessels and even take possession of those vessels in United States internal and territorial waters. This Act authorized the Coast Guard to conduct duties it had carried out during both World Wars to ensure the security of U.S. ports "from subversive or clandestine attacks". Other laws over the next fifty years further refined and broadened the authorities of the Captain of the Port to include routine port and shipping controls and management, and pollution response.

In many cases, these acts were modified over time to address security concerns. As an example, the Port and Tanker Safety Act
of 1978, which later became known as the Ports and Waterways Safety Act, was enacted to improve the navigation and vessel safety and protection of the marine environment brought about by increased commercial traffic and poorly maintained tankships. It authorized increased inspections of vessels and required compliance with enhanced safety standards coming into effect at that time. It also contained language that addressed planning and protective measures for the nation's ports, waterways and marine environment.

In 1986, additional language through amendments were implemented in the Omnibus Diplomatic Security and Anti-Terrorism Act of 1986, which authorized the Coast Guard to carry out or require measures, including "the establishment of security and safety zones...to prevent or respond to acts of terrorism" against a person, vessel, or structure that is 
1)subject to the jurisdiction of the United States and located within or adjacent to the marine environment or 
2) a vessel of the United States or an individual on board that vessel. It also authorized the Coast Guard to recruit and train regular and reserve members in the techniques of preventing and responding to acts of terrorism. 
Not by coincidence, the hijacking of the passenger ship ACHILLE LAURO had occurred the previous year. Concerns for maritime
terrorism rose and fell rather quickly.

So there was both a history and reasonably extensive library of laws that have recognized the threat of maritime terrorism, typically from a well-identified enemy, and fairly complete set of authorities to prosecute action against it. However, all said, the general concern for maritime security was that it was still a small and not usually conscious portion of the operational management of the maritime community, and that threats to the United States ports and vessel traffic were reasonably inconsequential.

Summarized Analysis
§70101 Report on Foreign Flag Vessels: the "Hit List"
The United States Coast Guard ("USCG") will issue a yearly Report of Foreign Flag Vessels, a list of nations whose vessels may be suspect based on past performance (previous use of false documents, poor flag state regulation, inadequate security requirements, etc.). 
The USCG currently uses a "Boarding Priority Matrix" in order to target vessels for inspection. The Boarding Priority Matrix assigns each ship a score based on five performance categories (operating company, flag state, classification society, prior history, and service). 
To a large extent, inspections will be based on a combination of the Report of Foreign Flag Vessels and the Boarding Priority Matrix - thus creating a "hit list" of vessels destined for inspections.

§ 70103 - Maritime Transportation Security Plans
Once the USCG has assessed the relative vulnerability of different vessel types, due to be completed by Apr. 1, 2003, and published on July 1, 2003, ship owners and operators will have to prepare Vessel Security Plans within 6 months (i.e. December. 1, 2003) and obtain approval or waiver from the USCG within 12 months (i.e. July 1, 2004). 
The MTSA final implementation date of July 1, 2004, aligns it with the IMO ISPS amendments, also due to enter into force by July 1, 2004.

Security plans are currently anticipated to consist of a range of the following elements:

1)Intrusion alarm system  
2)Bomb threat response 
3)Gangway watch procedures  
4)Deck and roving patrols  
5)Designation of secure access areas 
6)Security lighting 
7)Secure area access control  
8)Swimmer/Small craft attack prevention 
9)Duress words and codes 
10)Use of force 
 
 § 70105 - Transportation Security Cards
Transportation Security Cards will be required for access to secure areas of a vessel or facility.  
Transportation Security Cards will use biometric data in order to prevent forgery, theft, or illicit use.  
Cards will be issued to those who work in the transportation industry, such as vessel crew, pilots, longshoremen, etc.  
Cards will be issued unless an individual fits certain criteria identified as posing a risk (recent prior criminal convictions, association with terrorist groups, ineligible for entry to the US, etc.).

§ 70108-70110 Foreign Port assessment
Foreign ports will be assessed to determine whether or not they are sufficiently secure.  
Unless they pose an immediate threat, foreign ports that are not deemed in compliance with US security requirements will be notified and given 90 days to correct the problem(s).  
Failure to correct the problem(s) identified in the assessment may result in cargo from that foreign port being denied entry in the US. Transhipment ports are included in the assessment.

§ 70111 - Crew Identification
In addition to the Transportation Security Cards, all crew members must have proper identification.  
The Act envisions an international crew identification regime, like possibly under the auspices of the International Maritime Organization ("IMO") or the International Labor Organization ("ILO").

§ 70114 - Automatic Identification Systems
Automatic Identification Systems ("AIS") electronically transmit information about a vessel's identity, speed, course, heading, location, and other information.  
AIS information will be used for on-shore monitoring and by other vessels.  
By July 1, 2003 all tankers, vessels moving tankers, and most passenger vessels operating in US waters will be required to have AIS. All vessels operating in US waters must be equipped with AIS by December 31, 2004.

Important Provisions
1. Section 70102: U.S. Facility and Vessel Vulnerability Assessments
This provision will require the Secretary of the department in which the Coast Guard is operating to conduct an assessment of vessel types and facilities on or adjacent to the waters of the US to identify vessels and facilities that pose a "high risk of being involved in a transportation security incident". To that end, the Coast Guard will continue to conduct detailed vulnerability assessments of high-risk vessels and facilities, specifically to identify and evaluate critical assets and infrastructures, and threats and weaknesses in physical, passenger and cargo security systems.
Upon completion, the Coast Guard will provide the vessel or facility owner a copy of the assessment results, which will be updated every 5 years. The Secretary may also accept alternative assessments conducted on behalf of an owner or operator. The Council supported inclusion of this provision to ensure the Government takes responsibility for completing these counter terror assessments and providing the results to the industry.

2. Section 70103: Vessel and Facility Security Plans
This provision requires owners and operators of vessels operating in US waters to prepare and submit to the Secretary a security plan for a vessel or facility for deterring a transportation security incident to the maximum extent practicable. The Council expressed opposition to the language "deter to the maximum extent practicable", because the standard is vague and imprecise; nevertheless, this language remains in the final bill. However, because the US government is required to approve the vessel plans as meeting this standard, the provision should not create liability concerns that do not otherwise exist.
1 The term "Secretary", unless otherwise indicated, will refer to the Secretary of the department the Coast Guard is operating under.
Vessel and facility security plans must be submitted to the Secretary not more than six months after the promulgation of an interim final regulation on the subject. (Such an interim final regulation is likely to be promulgated by the Coast Guard in Spring 2003). The security plans must also include provisions for establishing and maintaining physical, passenger and cargo security, controlling access, and outlining training programs to protect a vessel or facility. The Secretary will then be required to approve the plans and provide appropriate feedback. It is our belief that the Coast Guard's review of the plans, as well as the interim final rule, will be based on the IMO rules to be approved in December 2002 and the recent Coast Guard Navigation and Vessel Inspection Circular (NVIC) 10-02 that we forwarded to Members on October 25.

3. Section 70105: Transportation Security Cards
This provision will require the Secretary to promulgate regulations to prevent specified individuals from entering a vessel or port facility area unless the individual holds a "transportation security card" or is accompanied by someone who has one. The Secretary will also be responsible for issuing these cards. This requirement is targeted at US domestic vessel and port facility workers, and will only apply to foreign individuals who arrive at US ports by sea and seek "unescorted access" to designated areas within a port facility. National background checks—which will be performed by the US government—will be a part of the card issuance process, and biometrics will be included in the card.

4. Section 70107: Port Security Research and Development Grants
This recently added provision will set aside $15 million per year through 2008, for the development of new technologies to secure US ports. Examples for possible grant fund uses include: increasing Customs' ability to inspect or target merchandise, enhancing accurate detection of explosives and chemical, biological, and radiological materials and agents, improving tags and seals for use on containers, and including smart sensors to detect hazardous or radioactive materials within a container.

5. Section 70108: Foreign Port Assessments
This provision requires the Secretary to assess the effectiveness of antiterrorism measures at major overseas ports from which vessels are bound to the US. Elements to be assessed include: screening of cargo and containers, access to the facilities, vessels and cargo, vessel security and compliance with "security standards". These standards are not defined in the bill, but the Council has consistently argued that they should be similar to or consistent with the standards developed by the IMO. If the Secretary finds that a specific port does not maintain adequate antiterrorism measures, he is obliged to notify appropriate foreign officials in the host country. He may also prescribe conditions of entry into the US for any vessel arriving from that port.

6. Section 70111: Enhanced Crewmember Identification 2
This short provision will require the Secretary, in consultation with the US Attorney General and the Secretary of State, to require crewmembers of vessels calling at US ports to carry and present a form of identification that the Secretary decides is necessary. This provision is consistent with regulations already promulgated by the Coast Guard under existing statutory authority.

7. Section 70113: Automated Identification Systems (AIS)
The bill will require AIS systems to be installed on all vessels while operating in US waters in accordance with the following implementation timeline:
 Any new vessel built after January 1, 2003, must have AIS systems installed
 Passenger vessels, tankers and tow vessels must have AIS systems installed by July 1, 2003.
 All other vessels (including liner vessels) must have AIS systems installed on or after December 31, 2004 

8. Section 103: International Seafarer Identification
This provision will require the Secretary to negotiate an international agreement that provides for a uniform, comprehensive, international system of identification for seafarers that will enable the United States and other countries to positively establish the identity of any seafarer aboard a vessel in the waters of the US or another country. This requirement also stipulates that if the Secretary fails to complete an international agreement within 2 years of the enactment of the bill, the Secretary must draft and submit to Congress legislation that will create a uniform, comprehensive system of identification for seafarers.
The Council, in addition to commenting on the transportation security card provision in the bill, argued strongly in support of a provision that would oblige the United States to participate in the development of and conform to the uniform international seafarer credentialing standards being developed by the International Labour Organization (ILO). The Council has recently filed comments to the Maritime Administration regarding the US government's position on this topic at the ILO.

9. Section 108: Technical Amendments Concerning Transmission of Certain Information To Customs
The bill includes a number of technical amendments to the Trade Act of 2002 regarding the manifesting of cargo exports. Regulations under this law regarding the documentation of export cargo will not be proposed by Customs until next year. The Council worked with the congressional staff to ensure that these amendments were in fact "technical" and would not confuse the export cargo manifesting process. Problematic elements from the various proposed technical elements were removed from the final bill.

The bill now includes technical amendments relating to the following issues: notification to Customs of improperly documented cargos; changing reporting requirements for vessel sharing agreements to allow for the reporting of undocumented cargo by the vessel accepting the booking—without regard to whether it operates the vessel; the exchange of information with Customs when containers are reassigned to another vessel; and, the handling of multiple container shipments.
This section of the bill also includes amendments to the Trade Act to require Customs to promulgate regulations, by October 31, 2003, to provide for the filing of electronic import and export cargo information for vessels bound to or departing from the US. This provision essentially extends Customs' deadline for complying with the Trade Act on the electronic filing of export manifest information by two months.

10. Section 111: Performance Standards
This short provision will require the Secretary, by January 1, 2004, to develop and maintain an anti-terrorism cargo identification, tracking and screening system for containers shipped to and from the US directly or via a foreign port. We believe that the existing AMS system for inbound cargo and the AES system for outbound cargo should serve this function.
This provision also requires the Secretary to develop performance standards to enhance the physical security of shipping containers, seals and locks. Efforts are underway to establish standards for container seals. We will be sending Members a separate memo on that topic in the near future.

See also
 Federal Maritime Security Coordinator
 Port security
 SAFE Port Act
 Transportation Worker Identification Credential

References

External links
 U.S. Coast Guard - MTSA Information website
 Text of the Act

United States federal defense and national security legislation
Acts of the 107th United States Congress